Tristan (also: Tristão) is the largest island in the Tristan and Capken Islands, Guinea. Its area is 226 km².

Islands of Guinea
Islands of the North Atlantic Ocean